The men's 300 metre team free rifle was a shooting sports event held as part of the Shooting at the 1920 Summer Olympics programme. It was the fourth and final appearance of the event. The competition was held on 31 July 1920. 70 shooters from 14 nations competed. The event was won by the United States, in its first (and only) appearance in the men's team free rifle. Norway finished with four podium appearances (all at silver or better) in the four appearances of the event, taking silver in 1920. Switzerland earned bronze, its first medal in the event since gold in 1900.

Albert Helgerud and Gudbrand Skatteboe each won their third medal in the event, matching Ole Sæther (1900, 1908, and 1912) for the most ever won; each of those Norwegian shooters had one gold and two silver medals. Østen Østensen earned his second medal, the seventh and last man to achieve multiple medals in the event.

Background

This was the fourth and final appearance of the men's 300 metre team rifle event, which was held 4 times between 1900 and 1920.

Czechoslovakia, Italy, Spain, and the United States each made their debut in the event. Denmark, France, and Norway each made their fourth appearance, having competed in each edition of the event before it was cancelled.

Competition format

The competition had each shooter fire 120 shots, 40 shots in each of three positions: prone, kneeling (or sitting), and standing. The target was 1 metre in diameter, with 10 scoring rings; targets were set at a distance of 300 metres. The five team members' scores were then summed. Thus, the maximum score possible was 6000 points. The scores for the individual and team events were the same.

Schedule

Results

The scores of the five shooters on each team were the scores from the 300 metre free rifle, three positions event and were summed to give a team score.

Morris Fisher, the individual champion, won his second gold medal.

References

External links
 Official Report
 

Shooting at the 1920 Summer Olympics
Men's 300m team